Štitáre is a village and municipality in the Nitra District in western central Slovakia, in the Nitra Region.

Geography 
The village lies at an altitude of about 240 metres and covers an area of 7.494 km². In 2016 it had a population of 872 people. It lies 7 km north-east to the historic city of Nitra. It is surrounded by Zobor mountain range in the north and agricultural fields in the south.

References

External links 
 Official Site

Villages and municipalities in Nitra District